The 2013 European Senior Tour was the 22nd season of the European Senior Tour, the professional golf tour for men aged 50 and above operated by the PGA European Tour. Paul Wesselingh won four events and the Order of Merit.

Tournament results
The numbers in brackets after the winners' names show the number of career wins they had on the European Senior Tour up to and including that event. This is only shown for players who are members of the tour.

For the tour schedule on the European Senior Tour's website, including links to full results, click here.

Leading money winners

There is a complete list on the official site here.

External links

European Senior Tour
European Seniors Tour